Usman Pribadi (born September 19, 1983) is an Indonesian footballer that currently plays for Madura in the Liga 2.

Club statistics

References

External links

1983 births
Association football goalkeepers
Living people
Indonesian footballers
Liga 1 (Indonesia) players
Deltras F.C. players
Persisam Putra Samarinda players
Indonesian Premier Division players
Gresik United players
PSDS Deli Serdang players
PSMS Medan players